

List of Ambassadors

Aharon Ofri (Non-Resident, Kampala) 1968 - 1971
Chargé d'affaires Meir Joffe (Non-Resident, Kigali)
Uri Lubrani (Non-Resident, Kampala) 1965 - 1967
Michael Michael (diplomat) (Non-Resident, Kampala) 1962 - 1965

References

Burundi
Israel